Behind Silence and Solitude is the debut studio album by the American metalcore band All That Remains, recorded in early 2000 and released on March 26, 2002. It is the only All That Remains album with guitarist Chris Bartlett and bass guitarist Dan Egan. A re-issued, remastered version of the album, with all new artwork, was released on October 9, 2007. The artwork was designed by Killswitch Engage bass guitarist Mike D'Antonio. Being the band's first album, it is the only album not to include any singles or music videos.

Background
All That Remains was formed in 1998 by then Shadows Fall vocalist Phil Labonte as a side project. After Labonte was asked to leave that band, All That Remains became a full-time project.

Before recording Behind Silence and Solitude, All That Remains recorded two demos, both released in 1999. The first demo features the songs "Follow", "From These Wounds" and "Shading" and was handed out at Milwaukee Metalfest 1999. The band's second demo, Demo 1999, features the same songs but with "Erase" replacing "From These Wounds". The demo version of "Follow" also features an orchestral intro.

Behind Silence and Solitude was recorded in early 2000, but was not released until two years later.

Track listing

Personnel
 Philip Labonte – vocals
 Chris Bartlett – guitar
 Oli Herbert – guitar
 Dan Egan – bass guitar
 Michael Bartlett – drums

References

2002 debut albums
All That Remains (band) albums
Metal Blade Records albums
Albums produced by Adam Dutkiewicz
Prosthetic Records albums
Razor & Tie albums
Albums produced by Chris "Zeuss" Harris